Northern Two Cayes Airstrip  is a public use airport serving Northern Caye, the largest island of the Lighthouse Reef off Belize.

See also

Transport in Belize
List of airports in Belize

References

External links 
Aerodromes in Belize - pdf

Airports in Belize